Derya is a Turkish and Kurdish unisex given name. It is also used as a surname. The word is derived from the Persian دریا ("Daryā"), meaning sea. In Old Persian it was pronounced 𐎭𐎼𐎹 (drayah-).

In Turkish it is pronounced DER-Yaa and is used for both female and male.

Baby names that sound like Derya include Dara (English), Darach, Dari (English).

In the Spanish version of this name it’s the result of the combination of “Deivid” & “Ramira” “Deyra”

Given name
 Derya Akay (born 1988), Turkish artist 
 Derya Akkaynak, Turkish mechanical engineer 
 Derya Aktop (born 1980), Turkish boxer
 Derya Alabora (born 1959), Turkish actress
 Derya Arbaş Berti (1968–2003), Turkish-American actress
 Derya Arhan (born 1999), Turkish football player
 Derya Ayverdi, Turkish actress
 Derya Bard Sarıaltın (born 1977), Turkish archer of Ukrainian origin
 Derya Büyükuncu (born 1976), Turkish Olympian swimmer
 Derya Can Göçen, Turkish world record holder free-diver
 Derya Cıbır (born 1990), Turkish judoka
 Derya Çalışkan (born 1966), Turkish judoka
 Derya Çayırgan (born 1987), Turkish volleyball player
 Derya Çimen, Turkish model
 Derya Durmaz (born 1973), Turkish actress
 Derya Erke (born 1983), Turkish Olympian swimmer
 Derya Karadaş (born 1981), Turkish actress
 Derya Sazak (born 1956), Turkish journalist and writer
 Derya Tınkaoğlu (born 1988), Turkish handball player
 Derya Türk-Nachbaur (born 1973), German politician 
 Derya Uluğ (born 1986), Turkish singer
 Derya Yanık (born 1972), Turkish politician and lawyer

Surname
 Doğuş Derya (born 1978), Turkish Cypriot activist and politician
 Huseyn Derya (1975–2014), Azerbaijani rapper and actor

See also
 Daria

Turkish unisex given names
Surnames from given names